KXBR (91.9 FM) is a radio station licensed to International Falls, Minnesota, United States.  The station is currently owned by Heartland Christian Broadcasters.

History
The station was assigned call sign KBOG on July 9, 1999. On January 19, 2000, the station changed its call sign to the current KXBR. It initially programmed a Modern Christian Rock format for the International Falls and Fort Frances area. featuring bands like Skillet, P.O.D., 12 Stones, Sent By Ravens, Red, and others.

The day after Thanksgiving 2013, KXBR changed formats to All Christmas Music. Following the Christmas format, KXBR became a Christian teaching/talk station on January 1, 2014.

References

External links

Christian radio stations in Minnesota
Radio stations established in 1999
International Falls, Minnesota
1999 establishments in Minnesota